The Henry W. Merriam House is an historic mansion in Newton, Sussex County, New Jersey, United States. Owned by industrialist Henry Wilson Merriam (1828–1900), the owner of the Merriam Shoe Company, the house was built in 1883 and was added to the National Register of Historic Places on December 18, 1970.  It is Newton's prime example of high Victorian architecture.

See also 
 National Register of Historic Places listings in Sussex County, New Jersey

References

External links
 

Houses on the National Register of Historic Places in New Jersey
Houses completed in 1883
Houses in Sussex County, New Jersey
National Register of Historic Places in Sussex County, New Jersey
Newton, New Jersey
New Jersey Register of Historic Places